Studio N is a 24-hour Telugu news channel from Narne group which is aired in Telangana and Andhra pradesh.

History
Studio N news channel was launched by its Chairman Narne Srinivasa Rao who is leader of YCP and a relative of TDP chairman N. Chandrababu Naidu.  Jr.NTR married the one and only daughter of Narne Srinivasa Rao on May 5, 2011.

Ownership

In 2014, Narne Srinivas Rao sold the Studio N business to godman and cult leader Kalki Bhagwan.

References

Telugu-language television channels
24-hour television news channels in India
Television stations in Hyderabad